Zhang Bu (died  December 264) was a military general of the state of Eastern Wu during the Three Kingdoms period of China. In 258, he and another general, Ding Feng, overthrew the regent Sun Chen in a coup and restored power to the emperor Sun Liang. In 264, after the death of Sun Liang's successor Sun Xiu, he supported Sun Hao to be the new emperor. However, shortly after Sun Hao's enthronement, Zhang Bu was exiled by the emperor for criticising his brutality. Sun Hao later sent his men to murder Zhang Bu while he was on his way to exile in Guangzhou.

See also
 Lists of people of the Three Kingdoms

Notes

References

 Chen, Shou (3rd century). Records of the Three Kingdoms (Sanguozhi).
 Pei, Songzhi (5th century). Annotations to Records of the Three Kingdoms (Sanguozhi zhu).
 Sima, Guang (1084). Zizhi Tongjian.

264 deaths
Eastern Wu generals
Eastern Wu politicians
Executed Eastern Wu people
People executed by Eastern Wu
3rd-century executions
Year of birth unknown